Bonacina is a surname. Notable people with the surname include:

Valter Bonacina (born 1964), Italian footballer and coach
Giovanni Battista Bonacina ( 1600s), Italian renaissance painter